Regis Philbin (August 25, 1931 – July 24, 2020) was an American media personality, actor, and singer, known for hosting talk and game shows since the 1960s. Philbin holds the Guinness World Record for the most hours on U.S. television.

Filmography

Film

Television

External links
 

Philbin, Regis
Philbin, Regis